Marco Baacke (born February 10, 1980) is a former German nordic combined skier who competed from 1999 to 2004. He won a gold medal in the 7.5 km sprint at the 2001 FIS Nordic World Ski Championships in Lahti.

Baacke also earned two other individual career victories in his career both in the 15 km individual events (1999: Germany, 2000: Austria).

External links 
 Official website 
 

1980 births
German male Nordic combined skiers
Living people
FIS Nordic World Ski Championships medalists in Nordic combined
21st-century German people